Henrik Lund may refer to:

 Henrik Lund (painter) (1879–1935), Norwegian painter and graphic artist
 Henrik Lund (academic) (born 1960), Danish engineer and professor at Aalborg University

See also
 Henrik Lundh (1895–1985), Norwegian civil servant
 Henrik L'Abée-Lund (born 1986), Norwegian biathlete
 Henning Jakob Henrik Lund (1875–1948), Greenlandic lyricist, painter and priest